Franklin Grube (Feb. 10, 1831-June 11, 1869) was an American physician and politician.

Grube was born in East Coventry, Chester County, Pa., Feb. 10, 1831.  He graduated from Yale College in 1852. In 1854 he graduated as M.D. at the University of Pennsylvania, then spent a year in foreign travel, and then removed to Clinton, Miss.  In 1857 he removed to Geary City, Kansas, where he practiced his profession. He also filled various public offices, and in 1861 was chosen by the Union party a member of the Kansas House of Representatives. During the war he served three years as a Surgeon of the U. S. Volunteers from Pennsylvania, and was for a time the executive officer of Denison General Hospital, Camp Dennison, Ohio.  Dr. Grube married, June 16, 1864, Miss A. L. Culver, of Rochester, N. Y., and soon after removed to Oregon City. He died of congestion of the liver at Jacksonville, Oregon, June 11, 1869, after an illness of only four days.  At the time of his death he was practicing medicine in Jacksonville. His widow survived him, with two sons.

Notes

External links

1831 births
1869 deaths
People from Chester County, Pennsylvania
People of Pennsylvania in the American Civil War
Members of the Kansas House of Representatives
Union Army officers
Physicians from Oregon
Politicians from Oregon City, Oregon
Yale College alumni
Perelman School of Medicine at the University of Pennsylvania alumni
19th-century American politicians
Military personnel from Oregon